The Billboard Icon Award was established at the 2011 Billboard Music Awards to recognize music singers and contribution. The recipient of the award also performs during the ceremony. In 2021, the Icon Award was included on the Billboard Latin Music Awards.

Recipients

Billboard Music Awards

Billboard Latin Music Awards

References

Icon
Awards established in 2011